Gönyeli is a town in Cyprus, near the capital city Nicosia. It is de facto under the control of Northern Cyprus. Over the years the town has merged with North Nicosia, making it connurbated with the city. Its population  is 11,671.

History 
Before the Ottoman conquest of Cyprus in 1571, the area consisted of empty fields. Upon the conquest, two families from Anatolia settled and founded Gönyeli, that of Kurt Ali from Anamur and Mehmet Efendi from Aksaray. Over time, as the families grew in population, the village grew as a farming community speaking Turkish.

Culture
The football club Gönyeli Spor Kulübü is based in Gönyeli. Gönyeli's stadium, Ali Naci Karacan Stadı (named for journalist Ali Naci Karacan), houses football matches as well as concerts and the annual 23 April Children's Day events.

Every July, the Gönyeli International Folk Dance Festival takes place in the town center. The event lasts one week, with groups of dancers from countries such as Bulgaria, Romania and Turkey performing traditional folk dance.

Gönyeli is a popular town for students looking to rent accommodation as it is about 15 minutes driving distance from the Nicosia-based Near East University.

International relations

Twin towns – sister cities
Gönyeli is twinned with:

 Kızılcahamam, Ankara, Turkey (since 2009)
 Sarıyer, Istanbul, Turkey

References

Communities in Nicosia District
Populated places in Lefkoşa District
Suburbs of Nicosia
Municipalities of Northern Cyprus